Danijel Furtula (born 31 July 1992 in Mojkovac) is a Montenegrin discus thrower who competed in the 2012 Summer Olympics, coming in 20th in qualification group 2 and not advancing. He won gold at the 2012 European Cup Winter Throwing in the under-23 category.

Personal bests

Outdoor

Competition record

References 

Montenegrin discus throwers
1992 births
Olympic athletes of Montenegro
Athletes (track and field) at the 2012 Summer Olympics
Athletes (track and field) at the 2016 Summer Olympics
Living people
Male discus throwers
Montenegrin male athletes
World Athletics Championships athletes for Montenegro
Mediterranean Games bronze medalists for Montenegro
Athletes (track and field) at the 2013 Mediterranean Games
Mediterranean Games medalists in athletics
Athletes (track and field) at the 2020 Summer Olympics
Athletes (track and field) at the 2022 Mediterranean Games